Mount Kowalczyk is a mountain,  high, standing  south of Goat Mountain at the head of Hobbs Glacier in Victoria Land, Antarctica. It was charted by the British Antarctic Expedition, 1910–13, under Robert Falcon Scott, and was named by the Advisory Committee on Antarctic Names in 1964 for Chester Kowalczyk, Chief of the Photogrammetry Branch, U.S. Naval Oceanographic Office, who for many years had responsibility for the photogrammetric compilation of Antarctic charts.

References

Mountains of Victoria Land
Scott Coast